

Events

Pre-1600
 506 – Alaric II, eighth king of the Visigoths, promulgates the Breviary of Alaric (Breviarium Alaricianum or Lex Romana Visigothorum), a collection of "Roman law".
 880 – Battle of Lüneburg Heath: King Louis III of France is defeated by the Norse Great Heathen Army at Lüneburg Heath in Saxony.
 962 – Translatio imperii: Pope John XII crowns Otto I, Holy Roman Emperor, the first Holy Roman Emperor in nearly 40 years.
1032 – Conrad II, Holy Roman Emperor becomes king of Burgundy.
1141 – The Battle of Lincoln, at which Stephen, King of England is defeated and captured by the allies of Empress Matilda.
1207 – Terra Mariana, eventually comprising present-day Latvia and Estonia, is established.
1438 – Nine leaders of the Transylvanian peasant revolt are executed at Torda.
1461 – Wars of the Roses: The Battle of Mortimer's Cross results in the death of Owen Tudor.
1536 – Spaniard Pedro de Mendoza founds Buenos Aires, Argentina.

1601–1900
1645 – Scotland in the Wars of the Three Kingdoms: Battle of Inverlochy.
1653 – New Amsterdam (later renamed The City of New York) is incorporated.
1709 – Alexander Selkirk is rescued after being shipwrecked on a desert island, inspiring Daniel Defoe's adventure book Robinson Crusoe. 
1814 – The last of the River Thames frost fairs comes to an end.
1848 – Mexican–American War: The Treaty of Guadalupe Hidalgo is signed.
1850 – Brigham Young declares war on Timpanogos in the Battle at Fort Utah.
1868 – Pro-Imperial forces capture Osaka Castle from the Tokugawa shogunate and burn it to the ground.
1870 – The Seven Brothers (Seitsemän veljestä), a novel by Finnish author Aleksis Kivi, is published first time in several thin booklets.
1876 – The National League of Professional Baseball Clubs of Major League Baseball is formed.
1881 – The sentences of the trial of the warlocks of Chiloé are imparted. 
1887 – In Punxsutawney, Pennsylvania, the first Groundhog Day is observed.
1899 – The Australian Premiers' Conference held in Melbourne decides to locate Australia's capital city, Canberra, between Sydney and Melbourne.
1900 – Boston, Detroit, Milwaukee, Baltimore, Chicago and St. Louis, agree to form baseball's American League.

1901–present
1901 – Funeral of Queen Victoria.
1909 – The Paris Film Congress opens, an attempt by European producers to form an equivalent to the MPCC cartel in the United States.
1913 – Grand Central Terminal opens in New York City.
1920 – The Tartu Peace Treaty is signed between Estonia and Russia.
1922 – Ulysses by James Joyce is published.
  1922   – The uprising called the "pork mutiny" starts in the region between Kuolajärvi and Savukoski in Finland.
1925 – Serum run to Nome: Dog sleds reach Nome, Alaska with diphtheria serum, inspiring the Iditarod race.
1934 – The Export-Import Bank of the United States is incorporated.
1935 – Leonarde Keeler administers polygraph tests to two murder suspects, the first time polygraph evidence was admitted in U.S. courts.
1942 – The Osvald Group is responsible for the first, active event of anti-Nazi resistance in Norway, to protest the inauguration of Vidkun Quisling.
1943 – World War II: The Battle of Stalingrad comes to an end when Soviet troops accept the surrender of the last organized German troops in the city.
1954 – The Detroit Red Wings played in the first outdoor hockey game by any NHL team in an exhibition against the Marquette Branch Prison Pirates in Marquette, Michigan.
1959 – Nine experienced ski hikers in the northern Ural Mountains in the Soviet Union die under mysterious circumstances.
1966 – Pakistan suggests a six-point agenda with Kashmir after the Indo-Pakistani War of 1965.
1971 – Idi Amin replaces President Milton Obote as leader of Uganda.
  1971   – The international Ramsar Convention for the conservation and sustainable utilization of wetlands is signed in Ramsar, Mazandaran, Iran.
1980 – Reports surface that the FBI is targeting allegedly corrupt Congressmen in the Abscam operation.
1982 – Hama massacre: The government of Syria attacks the town of Hama.
1987 – After the 1986 People Power Revolution, the Philippines enacts a new constitution.
1989 – Soviet–Afghan War: The last Soviet armoured column leaves Kabul.
1990 – Apartheid: F. W. de Klerk announces the unbanning of the African National Congress and promises to release Nelson Mandela.
1998 – Cebu Pacific Flight 387 crashes into Mount Sumagaya in the Philippines, killing all 104 people on board.
2000 – First digital cinema projection in Europe (Paris) realized by Philippe Binant with the DLP CINEMA technology developed by Texas Instruments.
2004 – Swiss tennis player Roger Federer becomes the No. 1 ranked men's singles player, a position he will hold for a record 237 weeks.
2005 – The Government of Canada introduces the Civil Marriage Act. This legislation would become law on July 20, 2005, legalizing same-sex marriage. 
2007 – Police officer Filippo Raciti is killed when a clash breaks out in the Sicily derby between Catania and Palermo, in the Serie A, the top flight of Italian football. This event led to major changes in stadium regulations in Italy. 
2012 – The ferry MV Rabaul Queen sinks off the coast of Papua New Guinea near the Finschhafen District, with an estimated 146–165 dead.
2021– The Burmese military establishes the State Administration Council, the military junta, after deposing the democratically elected government in the 2021 Myanmar coup d'état.

Births

Pre-1600
450  – Justin I, Byzantine emperor (d. 527)
1208 – James I of Aragon (d. 1276)
1425 (or 1426) – Eleanor of Navarre, Queen regnant of Navarre (d. 1479)
1443 – Elisabeth of Bavaria, Electress of Saxony (d. 1486)
1455 – John, King of Denmark (d. 1513)
1457 – Peter Martyr d'Anghiera, Italian-Spanish historian and author (d. 1526)
1467 – Columba of Rieti, Italian Dominican sister (d. 1501)
1494 – Bona Sforza, queen of Sigismund I of Poland (d. 1557)
1502 – Damião de Góis, Portuguese philosopher and historian (d. 1574)
1506 – René de Birague, Italian-French cardinal and politician (d. 1583)
1509 – John of Leiden, Dutch Anabaptist leader (d. 1536)
1517 – Gotthard Kettler, the last Master of the Livonian Order and the first Duke of Courland and Semigallia (d. 1587)
1522 – Lodovico Ferrari, Italian mathematician and academic (d. 1565)
1536 – Piotr Skarga, Polish writer (d. 1612)
1551 – Nicolaus Reimers, German astronomer (d. 1600)
1576 – Alix Le Clerc, French Canoness Regular and foundress (d. 1622)
1585 – Judith Quiney, William Shakespeare's youngest daughter (d. 1662)
  1585   – Hamnet Shakespeare, William Shakespeare's only son (baptised; d. 1596)
1588 – Georg II of Fleckenstein-Dagstuhl, German nobleman (d. 1644)
1600 – Gabriel Naudé, French librarian and scholar (d. 1653)

1601–1900
1611 – Ulrik of Denmark, Danish prince-bishop (d. 1633)
1613 – Noël Chabanel, French missionary and saint (d. 1649)
1621 – Johannes Schefferus, Swedish author and hymn-writer (d. 1679)
1650 – Pope Benedict XIII (d. 1730)
  1650   – Nell Gwyn, English actress, mistress of King Charles II of England (d. 1687)
1651 – William Phips, Royal governor of the Province of Massachusetts Bay (d. 1695)
1669 – Louis Marchand, French organist and composer (d. 1732)
1677 – Jean-Baptiste Morin, French composer (d. 1745)
1695 – William Borlase, English geologist and archaeologist (d. 1772)
  1695   – François de Chevert, French general (d. 1769)
1700 – Johann Christoph Gottsched, German author and critic (d. 1766)
1711 – Wenzel Anton, Prince of Kaunitz-Rietberg (d. 1794)
1714 – Gottfried August Homilius, German organist and composer (d. 1785)
1717 – Ernst Gideon von Laudon, Austrian field marshal (d. 1790)
1754 – Charles Maurice de Talleyrand-Périgord, French politician, Prime Minister of France (d. 1838)
1782 – Henri de Rigny, French admiral and politician, French Minister of War (d. 1835)
1786 – Jacques Philippe Marie Binet, French mathematician, physicist, and astronomer (d. 1856)
1802 – Jean-Baptiste Boussingault, French chemist and academic (d. 1887)
1803 – Albert Sidney Johnston, American general (d. 1862)
1829 – Alfred Brehm, German zoologist and illustrator (d. 1884)
  1829   – William Stanley, English engineer and philanthropist (d. 1909)
1841 – François-Alphonse Forel, Swiss limnologist and hydrologist (d. 1912)
1842 – Julian Sochocki, Polish-Russian mathematician and academic (d. 1927)
1849 – Pavol Országh Hviezdoslav, Slovak poet and playwright (d. 1921)
1851 – José Guadalupe Posada, Mexican illustrator and engraver (d. 1913)
1856 – Frederick William Vanderbilt, American railway magnate (d. 1938)
  1856   – Makar Yekmalyan, Armenian composer (d. 1905)
1857 – Jan Drozdowski, Polish pianist and music teacher (d. 1918)
1860 – Curtis Guild, Jr., American journalist and politician, 43rd Governor of Massachusetts (d. 1915)
1861 – Solomon R. Guggenheim, American businessman and philanthropist, founded the Solomon R. Guggenheim Museum (d. 1949)
1862 – Émile Coste, French fencer (d. 1927)
  1862   – Cornelius McKane, American physician, educator, and hospital founder (d. 1912)
1866 – Enrique Simonet, Spanish painter and academic (d. 1927)
1873 – Leo Fall, Austrian composer (d. 1925)
  1873   – Konstantin von Neurath, German politician and diplomat, 13th German Minister of Foreign Affairs (d. 1956)
1875 – Fritz Kreisler, Austrian-American violinist and composer (d. 1962)
1877 – Frank L. Packard, Canadian author (d. 1942)
1878 – Joe Lydon, American boxer (d. 1937)
1880 – Frederick Lane, Australian swimmer (d. 1969)
1881 – Orval Overall, American baseball player and manager (d. 1947)
1882 – Prince Andrew of Greece and Denmark (d. 1944)
  1882   – James Joyce, Irish novelist, short story writer, and poet (d. 1941)
1883 – Johnston McCulley, American author and screenwriter, created Zorro (d. 1958)
  1883   – Julia Nava de Ruisánchez, Mexican activist and writer (d. 1964)
1886 – William Rose Benét, American poet and author (d. 1950)
1887 – Ernst Hanfstaengl, German businessman (d. 1975)
1889 – Jean de Lattre de Tassigny, French general (d. 1952)
1890 – Charles Correll, American actor and screenwriter (d. 1972)
1892 – Tochigiyama Moriya, Japanese sumo wrestler, the 27th Yokozuna (d. 1959)
1893 – Cornelius Lanczos, Hungarian mathematician and physicist (d. 1974)
  1893   – Raoul Riganti, Argentinian race car driver (d. 1970)
  1893   – Damdin Sükhbaatar, Mongolian soldier and politician (d. 1924)
1895 – George Halas, American football player and coach (d. 1983)
  1895   – Robert Philipp, American painter (d. 1981)
  1895   – George Sutcliffe, Australian public servant (d. 1964)
1896 – Kazimierz Kuratowski, Polish mathematician and logician (d. 1980)
1897 – Howard Deering Johnson, American businessman, founded Howard Johnson's (d. 1972)
  1897   – Gertrude Blanch, Russian-American mathematician (d. 1996)
  1900   – Willie Kamm, American baseball player and manager (d. 1988)

1901–present
1901 – Jascha Heifetz, Lithuanian-born American violinist and educator (d. 1987)
1902 – Newbold Morris, American lawyer and politician (d. 1966)
  1902   – John Tonkin, Australian politician, 20th Premier of Western Australia (d. 1995)
1904 – Bozorg Alavi, Iranian author and activist (d. 1997)
1905 – Ayn Rand, Russian-born American novelist and philosopher (d. 1982)
1908 – Wes Ferrell, American baseball player and manager (d. 1976)
1909 – Frank Albertson, American actor (d. 1964)
1911 – Jack Pizzey, Australian politician, 29th Premier of Queensland (d. 1968)
1912 – Millvina Dean, English civil servant and cartographer (d. 2009)
  1912   – Burton Lane, American songwriter and composer (d. 1997)
1913 – Poul Reichhardt, Danish actor and singer (d. 1985)
1914 – Eric Kierans, Canadian economist and politician, 1st Canadian Minister of Communications (d. 2004)
1915 – Abba Eban, South African-Israeli politician and diplomat, 1st Israel Ambassador to the United Nations (d. 2002)
  1915   – Stan Leonard, Canadian golfer (d. 2005)
  1915   – Khushwant Singh, Indian journalist and author (d. 2014)
1916 – Xuân Diệu, Vietnamese poet and author (d. 1985)
1917 – Mary Ellis, British World War II ferry pilot (d. 2018)
  1917   – Đỗ Mười, Vietnamese politician, 5th Prime Minister of Vietnam (d. 2018)
1918 – Hella Haasse, Indonesian-Dutch author (d. 2011)
1919 – Lisa Della Casa, Swiss soprano and actress (d. 2012)
  1919   – Georg Gawliczek, German footballer and manager (d. 1999)
1920 – George Hardwick, English footballer and coach (d. 2004)
  1920   – John Russell, American Olympic equestrian (d. 2020)
  1920   – Arthur Willis, English footballer player-manager (d. 1987)
1922 – Kunwar Digvijay Singh, Indian field hockey player (d. 1978)
  1922   – Robert Chef d'Hôtel, French athlete (d. 2019)
  1922   – James L. Usry, American politician, first African-American mayor of Atlantic City, New Jersey (d. 2002)
  1922   – Stoyanka Mutafova, Bulgarian actress (d. 2019)
1923 – Jean Babilée, French dancer and choreographer (d. 2014) 
  1923   – James Dickey, American poet and novelist (d. 1997)
  1923   – Svetozar Gligorić, Serbian and Yugoslav chess grandmaster (d.2012)
  1923   – Bonita Granville, American actress and producer (d. 1988)
  1923   – Red Schoendienst, American baseball player, coach, and manager (d. 2018)
  1923   – Liz Smith, American journalist and author (d. 2017)
  1923   – Clem Windsor, Australian rugby player and surgeon (d. 2007)
1924 – Elfi von Dassanowsky, Austrian-American singer, pianist, producer (d. 2007)
  1924   – Sonny Stitt, American saxophonist and composer (d. 1982)
1925 – Elaine Stritch, American actress and singer (d. 2014)
1926 – Valéry Giscard d'Estaing, French academic and politician, 20th President of France (d. 2020)
1927 – Stan Getz, American saxophonist (d. 1991)
  1927   – Doris Sams, American baseball player (d. 2012)
1928 – Ciriaco De Mita, 47th Prime minister of Italy (d. 2022)
  1928   – Jay Handlan, American basketball player and engineer (d. 2013)
  1928   – Tommy Harmer, English footballer and youth team coach (d. 2007)
1929 – Sheila Matthews Allen, American actress and producer (d. 2013)
  1929   – George Band, English engineer and mountaineer (d. 2011)
  1929   – Věra Chytilová, Czech actress, director, and screenwriter (d. 2014)
  1929   – John Henry Holland, American computer scientist and academic (d. 2015)
  1929   – Waldemar Kmentt, Austrian operatic tenor (d. 2015)
1931 – Dries van Agt, Dutch politician, diplomat and jurist, Prime Minister of the Netherlands
  1931   – Les Dawson, English comedian and author (d. 1993)
  1931   – Glynn Edwards, Malaysian-English actor (d. 2018)
  1931   – John Paul Harney, Canadian educator and politician (d. 2021)
  1931   – Judith Viorst, American journalist and author
1932 – Arthur Lyman, American jazz vibraphone and marimba player (d. 2002)
  1932   – Robert Mandan, American actor (d. 2018)
1933 – M'el Dowd, American actress and singer (d. 2012)
  1933   – Tony Jay, English-American actor (d. 2006)
  1933   – Orlando "Cachaíto" López, Cuban bassist and composer (d. 2009)
  1933   – Than Shwe, Burmese general and politician, 8th Prime Minister of Burma
1934 – Khalil Ullah Khan, Bangladeshi actor (d. 2014)
1935 – Pete Brown, American golfer (d. 2015)
  1935   – Evgeny Velikhov, Russian physicist and academic
1936 – Metin Oktay, Turkish footballer and manager (d. 1991)
1937 – Don Buford, American baseball player and coach
  1937   – Eric Arturo Delvalle, Panamanian lawyer and politician, President of Panama (d. 2015)
  1937   – Anthony Haden-Guest, British journalist, poet, and critic
  1937   – Remak Ramsay, American actor
  1937   – Tom Smothers, American comedian, actor, and activist
  1937   – Alexandra Strelchenko, Ukrainian actress and singer (d. 2019)
1938 – Norman Fowler, English journalist and politician, Secretary of State for Transport
  1938   – Gene MacLellan, Canadian singer-songwriter (d. 1995)
1939 – Jackie Burroughs, English-born Canadian actress (d. 2010)
  1939   – Mary-Dell Chilton, American chemist and inventor and one of the founders of modern plant biotechnology
  1939   – Dale T. Mortensen, American economist and academic, Nobel Prize laureate (d. 2014)
1940 – Alan Caddy, English guitarist and producer (d. 2000)
  1940   – Thomas M. Disch, American author and poet (d. 2008)
  1940   – Wayne Fontes, American football player and coach
  1940   – David Jason, English actor, director, and producer
1941 – Terry Biddlecombe, English jockey (d. 2014)
1942 – Bo Hopkins, American actor (d. 2022)
  1942   – Graham Nash, English-American singer-songwriter and guitarist 
1944 – Andrew Davis, English organist and conductor
  1944   – Geoffrey Hughes, English actor (d. 2012)
  1944   – Ursula Oppens, American pianist and educator
1945 – John Eatwell, Baron Eatwell, English economist and academic
1946 – John Armitt, English engineer and businessman
  1946   – Blake Clark, American comedian and actor
  1946   – Alpha Oumar Konaré, Malian academic and politician, 3rd President of Mali
  1946   – Constantine Papadakis, Greek-American businessman and academic (d. 2009)
1947 – Greg Antonacci, American actor, director, producer, and screenwriter (d. 2017)
  1947   – Farrah Fawcett, American actress and producer (d. 2009)
1948 – Ina Garten, American chef and author
  1948   – Al McKay, American guitarist, songwriter, and producer
  1948   – Roger Williamson, English race car driver (d. 1973)
1949 – Duncan Bannatyne, Scottish businessman and philanthropist
  1949   – Yasuko Namba, Japanese mountaineer (d. 1996)
  1949   – Brent Spiner, American actor and singer
  1949   – Ross Valory, American rock bass player and songwriter
1950 – Osamu Kido, Japanese wrestler
  1950   – Libby Purves, British journalist and author
  1950   – Bárbara Rey, Spanish singer and actress
  1950   – Barbara Sukowa, German actress
  1950   – Genichiro Tenryu, Japanese wrestler
1951 – Vangelis Alexandris, Greek basketball player and coach
  1951   – Ken Bruce, Scottish radio host
1952 – John Cornyn, American lawyer and politician, 49th Attorney General of Texas
  1952   – Park Geun-hye, South Korean politician, 11th President of South Korea
  1952   – Ralph Merkle, American computer scientist and academic
  1952   – Carol Ann Susi, American actress (d. 2014)
1953 – Duane Chapman, American bounty hunter
  1953   – Jerry Sisk, Jr., American gemologist, co-founded Jewelry Television (d. 2013)
1954 – Christie Brinkley, American actress, model, and businesswoman
  1954   – Hansi Hinterseer, Austrian skier and actor
  1954   – Nelson Ne'e, Solomon Islander politician (d. 2013)
  1954   – John Tudor, American baseball player
1955 – Leszek Engelking, Polish poet and author (d. 2022)
  1955   – Bob Schreck, American author
  1955   – Michael Talbott, American actor
  1955   – Kim Zimmer, American actress
1956 – Adnan Oktar, Turkish cult leader
1957 – Phil Barney, Algerian-French singer-songwriter
1958 – Michel Marc Bouchard, Canadian playwright
1961 – Abraham Iyambo, Namibian politician (d. 2013)
  1961   – Lauren Lane, American actress and academic
1962 – Philippe Claudel, French author, director, and screenwriter
  1962   – Andy Fordham, English darts player (d. 2021)
  1962   – Paul Kilgus, American baseball player
  1962   – Kate Raison, Australian actress 
  1962   – Michael T. Weiss, American actor
1963 – Eva Cassidy, American singer and guitarist (d. 1996)
  1963   – Kjell Dahlin, Swedish ice hockey player
  1963   – Andrej Kiska, Slovak entrepreneur and philanthropist, President of Slovakia
  1963   – Philip Laats, Belgian martial artist
  1963   – Stephen McGann, English actor
  1963   – Vigleik Storaas, Norwegian pianist
1965 – Carl Airey, English footballer
  1965   – Naoki Sano, Japanese wrestler and mixed martial artist
1966 – Andrei Chesnokov, Russian tennis player and coach
  1966   – Robert DeLeo, American bass player, songwriter, and producer 
  1966   – Adam Ferrara, American actor and comedian
  1966   – Michael Misick, Caicos Islander politician, Premier of the Turks and Caicos Islands
1967 – Artūrs Irbe, Latvian ice hockey player and coach
  1967   – Laurent Nkunda, Congolese general
1968 – Kenny Albert, American sportscaster
  1968   – Sean Elliott, American basketball player and sportscaster
  1968   – Scott Erickson, American baseball player and coach
1969 – Dana International, Israeli singer-songwriter
  1969   – Valeri Karpin, Estonian-Russian footballer and manager
1970 – Roar Strand, Norwegian footballer
  1970   – Jennifer Westfeldt, American actress and singer
  1970   – Erik ten Hag, Dutch Football Manager
1971 – Michelle Gayle, English singer-songwriter and actress
  1971   – Arly Jover, Spanish actress
  1971   – Isaac Kungwane, South African footballer and sportscaster (d. 2014)
  1971   – Rockwilder, American rapper and producer
  1971   – Hwang Seok-jeong, South Korean actress
  1971   – Jason Taylor, Australian rugby league player and coach
1972 – Melvin Mora, Venezuelan baseball player
  1972   – Aleksey Naumov, Russian footballer
  1972   – Hisashi Tonomura, Japanese musician
1973 – Andrei Luzgin, Estonian tennis player and coach
  1973   – Aleksander Tammert, Estonian discus thrower
  1973   – Marissa Jaret Winokur, American actress and singer
1975 – Todd Bertuzzi, Canadian ice hockey player
  1975   – Donald Driver, American football player
  1975   – Ieroklis Stoltidis, Greek footballer
1976 – Ryan Farquhar, Northern Irish motorcycle racer
  1976   – James Hickman, English swimmer
  1976   – Ana Roces, Filipino actress
1977 – Shakira, Colombian singer-songwriter, producer, and actress
  1977   – Libor Sionko, Czech footballer
1978 – Adam Christopher, New Zealand writer
  1978   – Barry Ferguson, Scottish footballer and manager
  1978   – Lee Ji-ah, South Korean actress
  1978   – Faye White, English footballer
1979 – Urmo Aava, Estonian race car driver
  1979   – Fani Chalkia, Greek hurdler and sprinter
  1979   – Christine Lampard, Irish television host
  1979   – Shamita Shetty, Indian actress
  1979   – Irini Terzoglou, Greek shot putter
1980 – Teddy Hart, Canadian wrestler
  1980   – Zhang Jingchu, Chinese actress
  1980   – Oleguer Presas, Spanish footballer
1981 – Emre Aydın, Turkish singer-songwriter
  1981   – Michelle Bass, English model and singer
  1981   – Salem al-Hazmi, Saudi Arabian terrorist, hijacker of American Airlines Flight 77 (d. 2001)
1982 – Sergio Castaño Ortega, Spanish footballer
  1982   – Kelly Mazzante, American basketball player
  1982   – Kan Mi-youn, South Korean singer, model, and host
1983 – Ronny Cedeño, Venezuelan baseball player
  1983   – Carolina Klüft, Swedish heptathlete and jumper
  1983   – Jordin Tootoo, Canadian ice hockey player
  1983   – Vladimir Voskoboinikov, Estonian footballer
  1983   – Alex Westaway, English singer-songwriter and guitarist
1984 – Brian Cage, American wrestler
  1984   – Chin-Lung Hu, Taiwanese baseball player
  1984   – Mao Miyaji, Japanese actress
  1984   – Rudi Wulf, New Zealand rugby player
1985 – Masoud Azizi, Afghan sprinter
  1985   – Renn Kiriyama, Japanese actor
  1985   – Kristo Saage, Estonian basketball player
  1985   – Silvestre Varela, Portuguese footballer
1986 – Gemma Arterton, English actress and singer
  1986   – Miwa Asao, Japanese volleyball player
1987 – Anthony Fainga'a, Australian rugby player
  1987   – Saia Fainga'a, Australian rugby player
  1987   – Faydee, Australian singer
  1987   – Athena Imperial, Filipino journalist, Miss Earth-Water 2011
  1987   – Mimi Page, American singer-songwriter and composer
  1987   – Gerard Piqué, Spanish footballer
  1987   – Javon Ringer, American football player
  1987   – Jill Scott, English footballer
  1987   – Martin Spanjers, American actor and producer
1988 – JuJu Chan, Hong Kong-born American actress, martial artist, model, singer, taekwondo athlete and writer
  1988   – Zosia Mamet, American actress
1989 – Southside, American record producer
1991 – Nathan Delfouneso, English footballer
  1991   – Gregory Mertens, Belgian footballer (d. 2015)
  1991   – Shohei Nanba, Japanese actor
1992 – Lammtarra, American race horse (d. 2014)
  1992   – Joonas Tamm, Estonian footballer
1993 – Ravel Morrison, English footballer
  1993   – Bobby Decordova-Reid, English born Jamaican international footballer
1994 – Caterina Bosetti, Italian volleyball player
1995 – Paul Digby, English footballer
  1995   – Aleksander Jagiełło, Polish footballer
  1995   – Arfa Karim, Pakistani student and computer prodigy (d. 2012)
1996 – Harry Winks, English international footballer
1998 – Shiho Katō, Japanese singer and model
2000 – Munetaka Murakami, Japanese baseball player
2004 – Eleonore Caburet, French rhythmic gymnast

Deaths

Pre-1600
 619 – Laurence of Canterbury, English archbishop and saint
 880 – Bruno, duke of Saxony
1124 – Bořivoj II, Duke of Bohemia (b. 1064)
1218 – Konstantin of Rostov (b. 1186)
1237 – Joan, Lady of Wales
1250 – Eric XI of Sweden (b. 1216)
1294 – Louis II, Duke of Bavaria (b. 1229)
1347 – Thomas Bek, Bishop of Lincoln, was the bishop of Lincoln (b. 1282)
1348 – Narymunt, Prince of Pinsk
1416 – Racek Kobyla of Dvorce
1435 – Joan II of Naples, Queen of Naples (b. 1371)
1446 – Vittorino da Feltre, Italian humanist (b. 1378)
1448 – Ibn Hajar al-Asqalani, Egyptian jurist and scholar (b. 1372)
1461 – Owen Tudor, Welsh founder of the Tudor dynasty (b. c. 1400) 
1512 – Hatuey, Caribbean tribal chief
1529 – Baldassare Castiglione, Italian soldier and diplomat (b. 1478)
1580 – Bessho Nagaharu, Japanese daimyō (b. 1558)
1594 – Giovanni Pierluigi da Palestrina, Italian composer and educator (b. 1525)

1601–1900
1648 – George Abbot, English author and politician (b. 1603)
1660 – Gaston, Duke of Orléans (b. 1608)
  1660   – Govert Flinck, Dutch painter (b. 1615)
1661 – Lucas Holstenius, German geographer and historian (b. 1596)
1675 – Ivan Belostenec, Croatian linguist and lexicographer (b. 1594)
1688 – Abraham Duquesne, French admiral (b. 1610)
1704 – Guillaume de l'Hôpital, French mathematician and academic (b. 1661)
1712 – Martin Lister, English physician and geologist (b. 1639)
1714 – John Sharp, English archbishop (b. 1643)
1723 – Antonio Maria Valsalva, Italian anatomist and physician (b. 1666)
1768 – Robert Smith, English mathematician and theorist (b. 1689)
1769 – Pope Clement XIII (b. 1693)
1798 – Ferdinand Ashmall, English centenarian, Catholic priest, died in 73rd year of his ministry  (b. 1695)
1802 – Welbore Ellis, 1st Baron Mendip, English politician, Secretary of State for the Colonies (b. 1713)
1804 – George Walton, American lawyer and politician, Governor of Georgia (b. 1749)
1831 – Vincenzo Dimech, Maltese sculptor (b. 1768)
1836 – Letizia Ramolino, Italian noblewoman (b. 1750)
1861 – Théophane Vénard, French Catholic missionary (b. 1829)
1881 – Henry Parker, English-Australian politician, 3rd Premier of New South Wales (b. 1808)

1901–present
1904 – Ernest Cashel, American-Canadian criminal (b. 1882)
  1904   – William Collins Whitney, American financier and politician, 31st United States Secretary of the Navy (b. 1841)
1905 – Henri Germain, French banker and politician, founded Le Crédit Lyonnais (b. 1824)
1907 – Dmitri Mendeleev, Russian chemist and academic (b. 1834)
1909 – Carlo Acton, Italian pianist and composer (b. 1829)
1913 – Gustaf de Laval, Swedish engineer (b. 1845)
1918 – John L. Sullivan, American boxer (b. 1858)
1919 – Julius Kuperjanov, Estonian lieutenant (b. 1894)
1925 – Antti Aarne, Finnish historian and academic (b. 1867)
  1925   – Jaap Eden, Dutch speed skater and cyclist (b. 1873)
1926 – Vladimir Sukhomlinov, Russian general and politician (b. 1848)
1932 – Agha Petros, Assyrian general and politician (b. 1880)
1939 – Amanda McKittrick Ros, Irish author and poet (d. 1860)
  1939   – Bernhard Gregory, Estonian-German chess player (b. 1879)
1942 – Ado Birk, Estonian lawyer and politician, 3rd Prime Minister of Estonia (b. 1883)
  1942   – Daniil Kharms, Russian poet and playwright (b. 1905)
  1942   – Hugh D. McIntosh, Australian businessman (b. 1876)
1945 – Alfred Delp, German priest and philosopher (b. 1907)
  1945   – Carl Friedrich Goerdeler, German economist and politician (b. 1884)
  1945   – Johannes Popitz, German lawyer and politician (b. 1884)
1948 – Thomas W. Lamont, American banker and philanthropist (b. 1870)
  1948   – Bevil Rudd, South African runner and journalist (b. 1894)
1950 – Constantin Carathéodory, Greek mathematician and academic (b. 1873)
1952 – Callistratus of Georgia, Georgian patriarch (b. 1866)
1954 – Hella Wuolijoki, Estonian-Finnish author and politician (b. 1886)
1956 – Charley Grapewin, American actor (b. 1869)
  1956   – Truxtun Hare, American football player and hammer thrower (b. 1878)
  1956   – Pyotr Konchalovsky, Russian painter (b. 1876)
1957 – Grigory Landsberg, Russian physicist and academic (b. 1890)
1962 – Shlomo Hestrin, Canadian-Israeli biochemist and academic (b. 1914)
1966 – Hacı Ömer Sabancı, Turkish businessman (b. 1906)
1968 – Tullio Serafin, Italian conductor and director (b. 1878)
1969 – Boris Karloff, English actor (b. 1887)
1970 – Lawrence Gray, American actor (b. 1898)
  1970   – Bertrand Russell, English mathematician and philosopher, Nobel Prize laureate (b. 1872)
1972 – Natalie Clifford Barney, American author, poet, and playwright (b. 1876)
1973 – Hendrik Elias, Belgian academic and politician, 9th Mayor of Ghent (b. 1902)
1974 – Imre Lakatos, Hungarian-English mathematician and philosopher (b. 1922)
1975 – Gustave Lanctot, Canadian historian and academic (b. 1883)
1979 – Jim Burke, Australian cricketer  (b. 1930)
  1979   – Sid Vicious, English singer and bass player (b. 1957)
1980 – William Howard Stein, American biochemist and academic, Nobel Prize laureate (b. 1911)
1982 – Paul Desruisseaux, Canadian lawyer and politician (b. 1905)
1983 – Sam Chatmon, American singer and guitarist (b. 1897)
1986 – Anita Cobby, Australian murder victim (b. 1959)
  1986   – Gino Hernandez, American wrestler (b. 1957)
1987 – Carlos José Castilho, Brazilian footballer and manager (b. 1927)
  1987   – Alistair MacLean, Scottish novelist and screenwriter (b. 1922)
1988 – Marcel Bozzuffi, French actor, director, and screenwriter (b. 1929)
1989 – Ondrej Nepela, Slovak figure skater and coach (b. 1951)
  1989   – Arnold Nordmeyer, New Zealand minister and politician, 30th New Zealand Minister of Finance (b. 1901)
1990 – Paul Ariste, Estonian linguist and academic (b. 1905)
  1990   – Joe Erskine, Welsh boxer (b. 1934)
1992 – Bert Parks, American actor, singer, television personality; Miss America telecast presenter (b. 1914)
1993 – François Reichenbach, French director and screenwriter (b. 1921)
1994 – Marija Gimbutas, Lithuanian-American archeologist (b. 1921)
1995 – Thomas Hayward, American tenor and actor (b. 1917)
  1995   – Fred Perry, English tennis player (b. 1909)
  1995   – Donald Pleasence, English-French actor (b. 1919)
1996 – Gene Kelly, American actor, singer, dancer, and director (b. 1912)
1997 – Erich Eliskases, Austrian chess player (b. 1913)
  1997   – Sanford Meisner, American actor and coach (b. 1904)
1998 – Haroun Tazieff, German-French geologist and cinematographer (b. 1914)
1999 – David McComb, Australian singer-songwriter and guitarist (b. 1962)
2002 – Paul Baloff, American singer-songwriter (b. 1960)
  2002   – Claude Brown, American author (b. 1937)
2003 – Lou Harrison, American composer and educator (b. 1917)
2004 – Bernard McEveety, American director and producer (b. 1924)
2005 – Birgitte Federspiel, Danish actress (b. 1925)
  2005   – Max Schmeling, German boxer (b. 1905)
2007 – Vijay Arora, Indian actor (b. 1944)
  2007   – Billy Henderson, American singer (b. 1939)
  2007   – Joe Hunter, American pianist (b. 1927)
  2007   – Filippo Raciti, Italian police officer (b. 1967)
  2007   – Eric Von Schmidt, American singer-songwriter and guitarist (b. 1931)
  2007   – Masao Takemoto, Japanese gymnast (b. 1919)
2008 – Barry Morse, Canadian actor, director, and screenwriter (b. 1918)
  2008   – Katoucha Niane, Guinean model and author (b. 1960)
2011 – Edward Amy, Canadian general (b. 1918)
  2011   – Defne Joy Foster, Turkish actress (b. 1975)
  2011   – Margaret John, Welsh actress (b. 1926)
2012 – Joyce Barkhouse, Canadian author (b. 1913)
  2012   – Frederick William Danker, American lexicographer and scholar (b. 1920)
  2012   – George Esper, American journalist and academic (b. 1932)
  2012   – Dorothy Gilman, American author (b. 1923)
  2012   – James F. Lloyd, American pilot and politician (b. 1922)
2013 – Abraham Iyambo, Namibian politician (b. 1961)
  2013   – John Kerr, American actor and lawyer (b. 1931)
  2013   – Chris Kyle, American soldier and sniper (b. 1974)
  2013   – Lino Oviedo, Paraguayan general and politician (b. 1943)
  2013   – Pepper Paire, American baseball player (b. 1924)
  2013   – P. Shanmugam, Indian politician, 13th Chief Minister of Puducherry (b. 1927)
  2013   – Walt Sweeney, American football player (b. 1941)
  2013   – Guy F. Tozzoli, American architect (b. 1922)
2014 – Gerd Albrecht, German conductor (b. 1935)
  2014   – Tommy Aquino, American motorcycle racer (b. 1992)
  2014   – Nicholas Brooks, English historian (b. 1941)
  2014   – Eduardo Coutinho, Brazilian actor, director, producer, and screenwriter (b. 1933)
  2014   – Philip Seymour Hoffman, American actor, director, and producer (b. 1967)
  2014   – Luis Raúl, Puerto Rican comedian and actor (b. 1962)
  2014   – Bunny Rugs,  Jamaican singer (b. 1948)
  2014   – Nigel Walker, English footballer (b. 1959)
2015 – Joseph Alfidi, American pianist, composer, and conductor (b. 1949)
  2015   – Dave Bergman, American baseball player (b. 1953)
  2015   – Andriy Kuzmenko, Ukrainian singer-songwriter and actor (b. 1968)
  2015   – Molade Okoya-Thomas, Nigerian businessman and philanthropist (b. 1935)
  2015   – Stewart Stern, American screenwriter (b. 1922)
  2015   – The Jacka, American rapper and producer (b. 1977)
2016 – Bob Elliott, American comedian, actor, and screenwriter (b. 1923)
2020 – Bernard Ebbers, Canadian businessman, the co-founder and CEO of WorldCom (b. 1941)
2021 – Captain Sir Tom Moore, British Army officer and charity campaigner (b. 1920)
2023 – K. Viswanath, Indian actor, director and screenwriter (b. 1930)
  2023   – Butch Miles, American jazz drummer (b. 1944)

Holidays and observances 

 Groundhog Day
 Anniversary of Treaty of Tartu (Estonia)
 Christian Feast Day:
 Adalbard
 Cornelius the Centurion
 Martyrs of Ebsdorf
 February 2 (Eastern Orthodox liturgics)
 Constitution Day (Philippines)
 Day of Youth (Azerbaijan)
 Earliest day on which Shrove Monday can fall, while March 8 is the latest; celebrated on Monday before Ash Wednesday (Christianity), and its related observances:
 Bun Day (Iceland)
 Fastelavn (Denmark/Norway)
 Nickanan Night (Cornwall)
 Rosenmontag (Germany)
 Feast of the Presentation of Jesus at the Temple or Candlemas (Western Christianity), and its related observances:
 A quarter day in the Christian liturgical calendar (due to Candlemas). (Scotland)
 Celebration of Yemanja or Our Lady of Navigators (Candomblé)
 Le Jour des Crêpes (France)
 Our Lady of the Candles (Filipino Catholics)
 Virgin of Candelaria (Tenerife, Spain)
 Victory of the Battle of Stalingrad (Russia)
World Wetlands Day

References

External links

 BBC: On This Day
 
 Historical Events on February 2

Days of the year
February